Svend Hansen may refer to:
 Svend Helge Hansen, a Danish rower
 Svend Hansen (footballer, born 1905), a Danish footballer
 Svend Hansen (footballer, born 1906), a Danish footballer
 Svend Hansen (footballer, born 1922), a Danish footballer